Kevin Crouthers (born 3 January 1976) is a former professional rugby league footballer who played in the 1990s and 2000s.

Coaching career
Crouthers retired from playing, and was on the coaching staff at the Batley Bulldogs, working under Karl Harrison.

References

External links
Statistics at wolvesplayers.thisiswarrington.co.uk
1999 Rugby League: Team-By-Team Guide To Super League

1976 births
Living people
English rugby league players
Dewsbury Rams players
Bradford Bulls players
Keighley Cougars players
Wakefield Trinity players
Sheffield Eagles players
London Broncos players
Doncaster R.L.F.C. players
Widnes Vikings players
Warrington Wolves players
Chorley Lynx players
Batley Bulldogs players
Place of birth missing (living people)
Rugby league centres
Rugby league fullbacks
Rugby league locks
Rugby league wingers